"Just Looking" is a song by Welsh rock band Stereophonics, issued as the second single from their second album, Performance and Cocktails (1999). It was released on 22 February 1999, reaching number four on the UK Singles Chart and number 18 in Ireland. In 2022, it was certified gold by the British Phonographic Industry (BPI) for sales and streams of over 400,000. A live acoustic version is featured on CD two of the "Step On My Old Size Nines" single. The song's music video features the band in a car with Stuart Cable driving. He offers the other members a Jelly Baby, and the car ends up sinking underwater.

Track listing
UK limited-edition 7-inch single
A. "Just Looking"
B. "Postmen Do Not Great Movie Heroes Make" (featuring Marco Migliari)

UK CD1
 "Just Looking"
 "Postmen Do Not Great Movie Heroes Make" (featuring Marco Migliari)
 "Sunny Afternoon" (the Kinks cover)

UK CD2
 "Just Looking" (album version)
 "Local Boy in the Photograph" (recorded live for Radio One)
 "Same Size Feet" (recorded live for Radio One)

Credits and personnel
Credits are taken from the Performance and Cocktails album booklet.

Recording
 Written in September 1997 (a hotel in Amsterdam)
 Recorded at Real World (Bath, Somerset, England)
 Mastered at Metropolis (London, England)

Personnel

 Kelly Jones – music, lyrics, vocals, guitar
 Richard Jones – music, bass
 Stuart Cable – music, drums
 Marshall Bird – keyboards
 Bird & Bush – production
 Al Clay – mixing
 Ian Cooper – mastering

Charts

Certifications

References

1997 songs
1999 singles
Songs written by Kelly Jones
Stereophonics songs
V2 Records singles